Coptoproctis is a genus of moths of the family Yponomeutidae.

Species
Coptoproctis languida - Zeller, 1852 

Yponomeutidae